In Greek mythology, Epaphus (Ancient Greek: Ἔπᾰφος), also called Apis or Munantius, was a son of the Greek God Zeus and king of Egypt.

Family 
Epaphus was the son of Zeus and Io and thus, Ceroessa's brother. With his wife, Memphis (or according to others, Cassiopeia), he had one daughter, Libya while some accounts added another one who bore the name Lysianassa. These daughters later became mothers of Poseidon's sons, Belus, Agenor and possibly, Lelex to the former and Busiris to the latter. In other versions of the myth, Epaphus was also called father of Thebe, who was mother of Aegyptus and Heracles by Zeus. Through these daughters, Epaphus was the ancestor of the "dark Libyans, and high-souled Aethiopians, and the Underground-folk and feeble Pygmies".

Mythology

Birth 
The name/word Epaphus means "Touch". This refers to the manner in which he was conceived, by the touch of Zeus' hand. He was born in Euboea, in the cave Boösaule or according to others, in Egypt, on the river Nile, after the long wanderings of his mother. He was then concealed by the Curetes, by the request of Hera, but Io sought and afterward found him in Syria where he was nursed by the wife of the king of Byblus. According Strabo, Epaphus was born in a cave in Euboea.

Phaethon 
Epaphus was also a contemporary and the rival of Phaethon, son of Helios and Clymene. He criticized his heraldry saying, "Poor, demented fellow, what will you not credit if your mother speaks, you are so puffed up with the fond conceit of your imagined sire, the Lord of Day." This prompted Phaethon to undertake his fateful journey in his father's chariot of the sun.

Reign and death 
Epaphus is regarded in the myths as the founder of Memphis, Egypt. Hera being envious that her husband's bastard ruled such a great kingdom, saw to it that Epaphus should be killed while hunting.

David Rohl identifies Epaphus with the Hyksos pharaoh Apophis.

Argive genealogy

Notes

References

 Aeschylus, translated in two volumes. 2. Suppliant Women by Herbert Weir Smyth, Ph.D. Cambridge, MA. Harvard University Press. 1926. Online version at the Perseus Digital Library. Greek text available from the same website.
 Aeschylus, translated in two volumes. 1. Prometheus Bound by Herbert Weir Smyth, Ph.D. Cambridge, MA. Harvard University Press. 1926. Online version at the Perseus Digital Library. Greek text available from the same website.
 Apollodorus, The Library with an English Translation by Sir James George Frazer, F.B.A., F.R.S. in 2 Volumes, Cambridge, MA, Harvard University Press; London, William Heinemann Ltd. 1921. ISBN 0-674-99135-4. Online version at the Perseus Digital Library. Greek text available from the same website.
Euripides, The Complete Greek Drama, edited by Whitney J. Oates and Eugene O'Neill, Jr. in two volumes. 2. Phoenissae, translated by Robert Potter. New York. Random House. 1938. Online version at the Perseus Digital Library.
 Euripides, Euripidis Fabulae. vol. 3. Gilbert Murray. Oxford. Clarendon Press, Oxford. 1913. Greek text available at the Perseus Digital Library.
 Gaius Julius Hyginus, Fabulae from The Myths of Hyginus translated and edited by Mary Grant. University of Kansas Publications in Humanistic Studies. Online version at the Topos Text Project.
 Herodotus, The Histories with an English translation by A. D. Godley. Cambridge. Harvard University Press. 1920. Online version at the Topos Text Project. Greek text available at Perseus Digital Library.
 Nonnus of Panopolis, Dionysiaca translated by William Henry Denham Rouse (1863-1950), from the Loeb Classical Library, Cambridge, MA, Harvard University Press, 1940.  Online version at the Topos Text Project.
 Nonnus of Panopolis, Dionysiaca. 3 Vols. W.H.D. Rouse. Cambridge, MA., Harvard University Press; London, William Heinemann, Ltd. 1940–1942. Greek text available at the Perseus Digital Library.
 Pseudo-Clement, Recognitions from Ante-Nicene Library Volume 8, translated by Smith, Rev. Thomas. T. & T. Clark, Edinburgh. 1867. Online version at theoi.com
 Publius Ovidius Naso, Metamorphoses translated by Brookes More (1859-1942). Boston, Cornhill Publishing Co. 1922. Online version at the Perseus Digital Library.
 Publius Ovidius Naso, Metamorphoses. Hugo Magnus. Gotha (Germany). Friedr. Andr. Perthes. 1892. Latin text available at the Perseus Digital Library.
 Publius Papinius Statius, The Thebaid translated by John Henry Mozley. Loeb Classical Library Volumes. Cambridge, MA, Harvard University Press; London, William Heinemann Ltd. 1928. Online version at the Topos Text Project.
 Publius Papinius Statius, The Thebaid. Vol I-II. John Henry Mozley. London: William Heinemann; New York: G.P. Putnam's Sons. 1928. Latin text available at the Perseus Digital Library.
 Strabo, The Geography of Strabo. Edition by H.L. Jones. Cambridge, Mass.: Harvard University Press; London: William Heinemann, Ltd. 1924. Online version at the Perseus Digital Library.
 Strabo, Geographica edited by A. Meineke. Leipzig: Teubner. 1877. Greek text available at the Perseus Digital Library.

Mythological city founders
Children of Zeus
Demigods in classical mythology
Kings of Egypt in Greek mythology
Kings in Greek mythology
Egyptian characters in Greek mythology
Pharaohs of the Fifteenth Dynasty of Egypt
16th-century BC Pharaohs